Ríchard Javier Morales Aguirre (born 21 February 1975) is a Uruguayan retired footballer who played as a centre forward.

Nicknamed Chengue, he was mostly known for his tremendous physical strength and volatile temperament. He played professionally in four countries – mainly Spain – his heyday coming at Nacional.

Morales represented Uruguay at the 2002 World Cup, as well as in two Copa América tournaments.

Club career
Morales was born in Las Piedras, Canelones Department. After starting his professional career with Club Atlético Platense and Basáñez, he transferred to Club Nacional de Football in 1999. There, he helped the capital club to the 1998 Primera División title.

In January 2003, Morales moved to Spain, reuniting with Pablo García at CA Osasuna. After spending his first two and a half seasons as a rarely used attacking option (his first goals came in late April-early March 2004 in two consecutive 1–1 draws, against Real Valladolid and Málaga CF), he scored nine La Liga goals in the 2004–05 campaign, being instrumental in the Navarrese side's narrow escape from relegation.

Morales signed for Málaga subsequently, but would only net once in 2005–06 as the Andalusians went on to rank last, adding just two in the following season's second division.

On 5 August 2008 Morales, after a brief return stint with Nacional, agreed to a contract with Clube de Regatas do Flamengo for the rest of the campaign, with the option to renew the contract for another year. However, the following day, after club players were violently attacked by its fans, he decided not to join the Rio de Janeiro team.

On 31 August 2008, Morales signed with Grêmio Foot-Ball Porto Alegrense. The following 16 February he moved to L.D.U. Quito, but left the squad on 2 April due to his father's poor health; before retiring the following year, he played a few matches for Centro Atlético Fénix.

International career
Having first appeared for Uruguay at 26, during the 2001 Copa América – where he scored in the 1–2 semi-final loss to Mexico– Morales came to international prominence on 15 November 2001, when his two late goals against Australia in the qualification playoffs ensured his country a place at the 2002 FIFA World Cup.

In the final stages in South Korea and Japan, Morales netted once in the 3–3 draw against Senegal, but in the final stages he missed a header that would have been his team's fourth goal and taken Uruguay through to the Round of 16. He received a total of 27 caps, scoring six goals.

International goals for Uruguay
Score and results list Uruguay's goal tally first.

References

External links

National team data 

 

1975 births
Living people
Afro-Uruguayan
Uruguayan people of Spanish descent
Uruguayan footballers
Association football forwards
Uruguayan Primera División players
Uruguayan Segunda División players
Club Nacional de Football players
Centro Atlético Fénix players
La Liga players
Segunda División players
CA Osasuna players
Málaga CF players
Campeonato Brasileiro Série A players
Grêmio Foot-Ball Porto Alegrense players
Ecuadorian Serie A players
L.D.U. Quito footballers
Uruguay international footballers
2001 Copa América players
2002 FIFA World Cup players
2004 Copa América players
Uruguayan expatriate footballers
Expatriate footballers in Spain
Expatriate footballers in Brazil
Expatriate footballers in Ecuador
Uruguayan expatriate sportspeople in Spain
Uruguayan expatriate sportspeople in Brazil
Uruguayan expatriate sportspeople in Ecuador